Night Raid was a sire of Throughbred racehorses, foaled in 1918.

A night raid is a military raid that occurs at night.

Night Raid may also refer to:

 Night raid (Afghanistan), a military tactic used in the War in Afghanistan.
 Night Raid (video game), a 1992 video game remake of Paratrooper
 Night Raid (Akame ga Kill!), the main group of assassins in the manga series Akame ga Kill!
 Night Raid 1931, a Japanese anime series 
 "Night Raid", a soundtrack song by Maurice Seezer for the 1997 film The Boxer
 "Night Raid", a song by Nick Cave and the Bad Seeds from their 2019 album Ghosteen
 "Nite Raid/Rescue", an episode from the animated TV series The Head
 Night Raid, a 2001 video game by Takumi Corporation

See also
 Night Raider, a video game
 Night Raiders (disambiguation)
 
 Raid (disambiguation)